The 2016 United States presidential election in Minnesota was held on Tuesday, November 8, 2016, as part of the 2016 United States presidential election in which all 50 states plus the District of Columbia participated. Minnesota voters chose electors to represent them in the Electoral College via a popular vote, pitting the Republican Party's nominee, businessman Donald Trump, and running mate Indiana Governor Mike Pence against Democratic Party nominee, former Secretary of State Hillary Clinton, and her running mate Virginia Senator Tim Kaine. Minnesota has ten electoral votes in the Electoral College.

Despite Trump flipping many mid-western/rust belt states, some of them which hadn't voted Republican since the 1980s, Minnesota was still won with a plurality by Clinton and a 1.52% margin, the eleventh consecutive Democratic presidential win in the state, which has not voted for a Republican since Richard Nixon in 1972. However, this was the closest presidential election in Minnesota since 1984, when Walter Mondale carried the state by a 0.18% margin, and it became the only state that was not carried by Ronald Reagan that year. The state also voted more Republican than the national average for the first time since 1952, with Trump flipping nineteen counties to Republican. Minnesota had the highest voter turnout in the nation, with approximately 75 percent of the state's eligible voters participating in the general election. Through her narrow victory, Clinton won all ten of Minnesota's electoral votes; one elector, Muhammud Abdurrahan, tried to vote for Senator Bernie Sanders of Vermont but was replaced with an elector that voted for Clinton.

Caucuses

Democratic caucuses

Bernie Sanders received the most votes and the most delegates in the precinct caucuses. The 2016 turnout was slightly lower than the 2008 tally of 214,066, when Obama won with 142,109 votes, to Clinton's 68,994. Bernie Sanders won every congressional district in Minnesota.

Republican caucuses

The 38 delegates from Minnesota were allocated in this way. If a candidate received more than 85% of the vote, they would get all of 38 delegates. Otherwise, 24 delegates would be allocated proportionally based on the votes per congressional district (3 votes per district). On top of that, there were 10 at-large delegates and 3 party leaders (the National Committee Man, the National Committee woman, and the chairman of the Minnesota Republican Party). All of the at-large delegates were allocated proportionally based on the popular vote with a mandatory threshold of 10% to receive any delegates; if no one got at least 10%, all candidates would be eligible to get delegates. 

Some media outlets recorded the votes by congressional district, rather than by county. Rubio won districts 1, 2, 3, 4 and 5 in the Minneapolis-Saint Paul area as well as the southern part of the state. Cruz won districts 6, 7 and 8 in the St. Cloud area and rural north.

Green caucuses
The Green Party of Minnesota held caucuses on March 1 in Saint Paul, Minneapolis, Bemidji, White Bear Lake, Blaine, Grand Rapids, and Willmar. Jill Stein won the caucuses with 84.3% of the vote. The delegates apportioned to each candidate will be decided at the state convention in St. Cloud, Minnesota in June. The results of the caucuses are as follows:

Libertarian caucuses

The Minnesota caucus was run on March 1, 2016, using ranked choice voting. Gary Johnson took over 75% of the 226 first-preference votes cast, with John McAfee a distant second on 11.5% and Austin Petersen third on 7.5%.

General election

Predictions

Polling

Clinton won almost every pre-election poll in Minnesota by margins ranging from 5 to 11 points. Trump won one poll in November 2015, 45% to 42%, and one poll in September 2016 showed a tie. The average of the last two polls had Clinton up 50% to 41%. The last poll had Clinton up 53% to 42%.

Candidates
The following had write-in status:

Results

Results by county

Counties that flipped from Democratic to Republican

Beltrami (largest city: Bemidji)
Blue Earth (largest city: Mankato)
Chippewa (largest city: Montevideo)
Clay (largest city: Moorhead)
Fillmore (largest city: Spring Valley)
Freeborn (largest city: Albert Lea)
Houston (largest city: La Crescent)
Itasca (largest city: Grand Rapids)
Kittson (largest city: Hallock)
Koochiching (largest city: International Falls)
Lac qui Parle (largest city: Madison)
Mahnomen (largest city: Mahnomen)
Mower (largest city: Austin)
Nicollet (largest city: North Mankato)
Norman (largest city: Ada)
Rice (largest city: Faribault)
Swift (largest city: Benson)
Traverse (largest city: Wheaton)
Winona (largest city: Winona)

Results by congressional district
Trump won 5 of 8 congressional districts, including three held by Democrats, while Clinton won one held by Republicans.

Analysis
Minnesota voted 6.2 percent less Democratic from the 2012 presidential election, a much larger shift than the nation at large. Donald Trump only increased his vote tally compared to Mitt Romney in 2012 by 2,726 votes which resulted in a percentage of vote loss of 0.04%. The difference in Democratic voting was largely attributed to Independent or Write-In candidates. The most significant Independent gains went to Gary Johnson with 3.84 percent of the vote (+2.64% over 2012), Evan McMullin with 1.8 percent of the vote (he was not a candidate in 2012), and Jill Stein with 1.26 percent of the vote (+0.82% over 2012). These three candidates account for 5.26 percent of the swing. This election marked the first time since 1952 that the Democratic candidate performed worse in Minnesota than in the nation at large. Hillary Clinton won the national popular vote by 2.1 points but won Minnesota by just 1.5 points, or 44,765 votes. Minnesota has been a primarily Democratic state in national elections since 1932.

Due to Independent and Write-In gains throughout the state, Clinton was dependent on her wins in Hennepin (Minneapolis) and Ramsey (St. Paul) counties, the two most populous counties in the state, and the Arrowhead Region in the northeastern corner of the state. Trump's votes came from less populated, rural counties. Two counties, Morrison and Todd, gave Trump over 70% of the vote, making this the first election since 1968 where either major party candidate won a county with over 70%, with Trump also being the first Republican since Dwight D. Eisenhower to do so since 1956.

Trump was also the first Republican to receive a majority of votes in Itasca County since Herbert Hoover in 1928, the first to win Swift County since Dwight D. Eisenhower in 1952, and the first to win Mower County since Richard Nixon against John F. Kennedy in 1960. Due to the close margin of victory in the state, Republicans had targeted Minnesota as a potential swing state target for the 2020 United States presidential election.

See also
 United States presidential elections in Minnesota
 2016 Democratic Party presidential debates and forums
 2016 Democratic Party presidential primaries
 2016 Republican Party presidential debates and forums
 2016 Republican Party presidential primaries

References

Further reading

External links
 RNC 2016 Republican Nominating Process 
 Green papers for 2016 primaries, caucuses, and conventions
 Decision Desk Headquarter Results for Minnesota
 Minnesota Secretary Of State - Historical Voter Turnout Statistics

Minne
2016
Presidential